Friday Night Productions (FNP) is an Indian entertainment company set up by Indian School of Business alumni Ravi Agnihotri, Abhishek Mohunta, Sandeep Goel and Pritika Idnani.

Friday Night Productions was set up to make thematic and content-driven movies, which the company's founders believed was missing in Bollywood productions. The first movie produced by the company in this genre is Buddha in a Traffic Jam to be released in 2016. Buddha in a Traffic Jam features National Film Awards winners Anupam Kher and Pallavi Joshi and also features Dev.D lead Mahi Gill and Yeh Saali Zindagi lead Arunoday Singh as Starcast.

References

External links
 Friday Night Productions Filmography on Bollywood Hungama

Companies based in Hyderabad, India
Entertainment companies of India
2010 establishments in Andhra Pradesh
Indian companies established in 2010